Donald P. DeWitte is a Republican member of the Illinois Senate for the 33rd District.

The 33rd district includes all or parts of Batavia, Crystal Lake, East Dundee, Elgin, Gilberts, Lakewood, Pingree Grove, Sleepy Hollow, South Elgin, Wayne, Geneva, St. Charles, West Dundee, Hampshire, Huntley, Carpentersville, Lake in the Hills and Algonquin.

Prior to his appointment to the Illinois State Senate, DeWitte served as Mayor of St. Charles from 2005 to 2013, and as a St. Charles alderman from 1993 to 2005. He also served as the Kane County representative to the Regional Transportation Authority Board from 2013 to 2018.

Illinois Senate 
In 2018, DeWitte was appointed to the Illinois State Senate to represent the 33rd District after incumbent Senator Karen McConnaughay resigned. He was sworn in in September 2018 and was elected to the position in November 2018, narrowly defeating Democrat Nancy Zettler.

In 2021, DeWitte became an assistant Republican leader.

Votes

Workers' rights 

 Voted against raising the state minimum wage to $15 an hour
 Voted against prohibiting Right To Work Laws
 Voted against HB 834, which required employees to be paid equally

Voting rights 

 Voted against allowing people in jail who have not been convicted of a crime to vote
 Voted in favor of SB-1970, which authorized student absences for voting
 Voted against expanding absentee voting for the 2020 general election

Education 

 Voted against SB-25, which would have made kindergarten mandatory for five year-olds in Illinois
 Voted against SB 10, which increased the mandatory baseline salaries for public school teachers in the state
 Voted against HB 2691, which authorized tuition assistance to students who are trans or undocumented
 Voted against HB 2265, which requires civics education to be taught in grades 6, 7, and 8
 Voted against HB 246, which requires public schools to teach about prominent LGBTQ+ historical figures
 Voted against HB 2170, which requires school curriculum to emphasize Black and minority group contributions
 Voted against prohibiting school discrimination against certain hairstyles

Police and prison policy 

 Voted against HB 1613, which requires police to keep records on racial profiling
 Voted against allowing people in jail who have not been convicted of a crime to vote
 Voted against HB 2040, which prohibits private prisons and jails in Illinois
 Voted against abolishing cash bail

LGBTQ+ rights 

 Voted against HB 246, which requires public schools to teach about prominent LGBTQ+ historical figures
 Voted against HB 3534, which added a nonbinary gender marker option for state ID's

Cannabis 

 Voted against HB 1438, which legalized recreational cannabis in Illinois

Racial justice 

 Voted against requiring women and Black people to serve on corporate boards
 Voted against HB 1613, which requires police to keep records on racial profiling
 Voted against HB 2170, which requires school curriculum to emphasize Black and minority group contributions
 Voted against HB 158, which aims to reduce racial disparities in medical care
 Voted against prohibiting school discrimination against certain hairstyles

Immigration 

 Voted against SB 667, which would have prohibited cities and counties from entering into contracts with Immigration and Customs Enforcement

Climate and energy 

 Voted against requiring all energy production to be from renewable sources by 2050

Health care and abortion 

 Voted against repealing the Parental Notice of Abortion Act
 Voted against HB 158, which aims to reduce racial disparities in medical care

Committee assignments 
In the 101st General Assembly, DeWitte served on the Senate Committees on Appropriations II; Education, Revenue, Local Government, Telecommunications and InfoTechnology; Transportation; Government Accountability and Pensions; and the Committee of the Whole.

In the 102nd General Assembly, he serves on the Senate Committees on Appropriations; Behavioral and Mental Health; Commerce; Executive; Local Government; Pensions; Revenue; Transportation; and Administrative Rules.

Electoral history

Personal life 
DeWitte attended Elgin Community College and the University of Illinois at Springfield before beginning a four decades-long career in the building materials industry, serving in various positions with local and national manufacturers, primarily in kitchen design and sales.

DeWitte and his wife Diane have two children and are members of St. Patrick Church in St. Charles.

References

External links
Senator Donald P. DeWitte (R) 33rd District at the Illinois General Assembly
By session: 100th, 101st

Republican Party Illinois state senators
Living people
21st-century American politicians
People from St. Charles, Illinois
Year of birth missing (living people)